St John Paul II College Gulu is a boys and girls O and A level secondary school in Laliya Parish, Bungatira Subcounty, Gulu District Uganda.  SJPIIC is a private Catholic boarding school which hosts approximately 110 students.

External links
http://stjohnpaul2college.sc.ug/index.php

Boarding schools in Uganda